Knickerbocker Field Club is a historic tennis association located in Flatbush, Brooklyn, New York, New York. It was founded in 1889, and continues to operate to this day.

Its historic tennis clubhouse was built in 1892 and was the sole surviving building associated with the Tennis Court development until 1988, when it was partially destroyed by fire.  It was razed in 1992 with the approval of the Landmark Preservation Commission due to lack of funds for restoration. It was a long, two story Colonial Revival style building sheathed in clapboard and shingles.  It had a gambrel roof and featured a deep porch supported by Doric order columns. It was listed on the National Register of Historic Places in 1982. A replacement clubhouse was built after.

The club features 5 clay courts. It has an active roster of 160 members, with a waiting list to join. The Knickerbocker also offers a free summer program for neighborhood children.

References

External links
Field Club website

Clubhouses on the National Register of Historic Places in New York City
Clubhouses in Brooklyn
Colonial Revival architecture in New York (state)
Infrastructure completed in 1892
National Register of Historic Places in Brooklyn
Buildings and structures demolished in 1992
Demolished buildings and structures in Brooklyn